The 2019–20 Elite One Championship was the 85th season of France's domestic rugby league competition and the 19th season known as the Elite One championship. There were ten teams in the league. Each team was to 19 matches in the regular season and the top six teams progressed to the finals series.

On 14 April 2020, due to the COVID-19 pandemic in France, the season was declared null and void.

Ladder

Source:

See also 

Rugby league in France
French Rugby League Championship
Elite One Championship

References 

https://competitions.ffr13.fr/elite-1/#classement

Rugby league competitions in France
2019 in French rugby league
2020 in French rugby league